Interstate 30 (I-30) is a  Interstate Highway in the southern states of Texas and Arkansas in the United States. I-30 travels from I-20 west of Fort Worth, Texas, northeast via Dallas, and Texarkana, Texas, to I-40 in North Little Rock, Arkansas. The highway parallels U.S. Highway 67 (US 67) except for the portion west of downtown Dallas (which was once part of I-20). Between the termini, I-30 has interchanges with I-35W, I-35E, and I-45. I-30 is known as the Tom Landry Freeway between I-35W and I-35E, within the core of the Dallas–Fort Worth metroplex.

Route description

|-
|Texas || 
|-
|Arkansas || 
|-
|Total || 
|}

I-30 is the shortest two-digit Interstate with a number ending in zero in the Interstate System. The Interstates ending in zero are generally the longest east–west Interstates. The largest metropolitan areas that I-30 travels through include the Dallas–Fort Worth metroplex, the Texarkana metropolitan area, and the Little Rock metropolitan area.

Texas

The western end and zero mile point of I-30 in Texas is at its intersection with I-20 in Parker County near Aledo. It then travels near downtown Fort Worth on a new routing further south than the now removed Lancaster Elevated section of the freeway. The section of I-30 between Dallas and Fort Worth is designated the Tom Landry Highway in honor of the longtime Dallas Cowboys coach. Though I-30 passed well south of Texas Stadium, the Cowboys' former home, their new stadium in Arlington, Texas, is near I-30. However, the freeway designation was made before Arlington voted to build AT&T Stadium. This section was previously known as the Dallas–Fort Worth Turnpike, which preceded the Interstate System. Although tolls had not been collected for many years, it was still known locally as the Dallas–Fort Worth Turnpike until its renaming. The section from downtown Dallas to Arlington was widened to over 16 lanes in some sections by 2010. From June 15, 2010, through February 6, 2011, this  section of I-30 was temporarily designated as the "Tom Landry Super Bowl Highway" in commemoration of Super Bowl XLV, which was played at Cowboys Stadium.

In Dallas, I-30 is known as East R.L. Thornton Freeway between downtown Dallas and the eastern suburb of Mesquite. I-30 picks up the name from I-35E south at the Mixmaster interchange. The Mixmaster is scheduled to be reconstructed as part of the Horseshoe project, derived from the larger Pegasus Project. The section from downtown Dallas to State Highway Loop 12 (Loop 12, Buckner Boulevard) is eight lanes plus an HOV lane. This section will be reconstructed under the East Corridor project to 12 lanes by 2025–2030. From Rockwall to a point past Sulphur Springs, I-30 runs concurrent with US 67. Through the city of Greenville, I-30 is known as Martin Luther King Jr. Freeway. I-30 continues northeasterly through East Texas until a few miles from the Texas–Oklahoma border, when the route turns east toward Arkansas.

Arkansas

I-30 enters southwestern Arkansas at Texarkana, the twin city of Texarkana, Texas. I-30 intersects I-49, after which it travels northeast. I-30 then passes through Hope, birthplace of former President Bill Clinton. I-30 then serves Prescott, Gurdon, Arkadelphia, and Malvern. At Malvern, drivers can use US 70 or US 270 to travel into historic Hot Springs or beyond into Ouachita National Forest. There, US 70 and US 67 join I-30 and stay with the Interstate into the Little Rock city limits. Northeast of Malvern, I-30 passes through Benton before reaching the Little Rock city limits. From Benton to its end at I-40, I-30 is a six-lane highway with up to 85,000 vehicles per day. As I-30 enters Little Rock, I-430 leaves its parent route to create a western bypass of the city. Just south of downtown, I-30 meets the western terminus of I-440 and the northern terminus of another auxiliary route in I-530. At this three-way junction of Interstates, I-30 turns due north for the final few miles of its route. Here, I-30 passes through the capitol district of Little Rock. I-30 also creates one final auxiliary route in I-630, or the Wilbur D. Mills Freeway, which splits downtown Little Rock in an east–west direction before coming to its other end at I-430 just west of downtown. After passing I-630, I-30 crosses the Arkansas River into North Little Rock and comes to its eastern terminus, despite facing north, at I-40. At its end, I-30 is joined by US 65, US 67, and US 167. US 65 joins I-40 westbound, while US 67 and US 167 join I-40 eastbound from I-30's eastern terminus.

History

The very first fully controlled-access part of what is now I-30 was the Dallas–Fort Worth Turnpike, a  controlled-access tollway in the Dallas–Fort Worth Metroplex. Completed by 1957, it operated as a toll road between 1957 and 1977, afterward becoming a nondescript part of I-20 and then I-30. The road, three lanes in each direction but later widened, is the only direct connection between downtown Fort Worth and downtown Dallas, Texas. In October 2001, the former turnpike was named the Tom Landry Highway, after the late Dallas Cowboys coach.

The proposed expressway was studied as early as 1944 but was turned down by the state engineer due to the expense. However, in 1953, the state legislature created the Texas Turnpike Authority, which, in 1955, raised $58.5 million (equivalent to $ million in ) to build the project. Construction started later that year. On August 27, 1957, the highway was open to traffic, but the official opening came a week later on September 5. The turnpike's presence stimulated growth in Arlington and Grand Prairie and facilitated construction of Six Flags Over Texas. At the end of 1977, the bonds were paid off, and the freeway was handed over to the state Department of Transportation, toll collection ceased, and the tollbooths were removed in the first week of 1978.

The existing US 67 route was already in heavy use in the early 1950s, at which point it was twinned from just east of Dallas to Rockwall and also a rural section near Greenville and a few miles in Hopkins County. There were still a few at-grade crossings on these two sections into the 1980s. The twinned US 67 routes were upgraded to Interstate Highway standards beginning in 1961, forming the R.L. Thornton Freeway. By the mid-1960s, much of I-30 was under construction outside the metroplex as well. The majority of the route was completed by 1965, but a  stretch through rural areas built on a new alignment well away from US 67 between Mount Pleasant and New Boston remained unfinished. This remaining segment was finally built and opened to traffic in 1971, completing I-30.

Originally, the west end of I-30 was at the current intersection of I-30 and US 80 near the border of Mesquite and Dallas. I-20 went into downtown Dallas and across the former turnpike through downtown Fort Worth and to points west. Later, I-20 took its current southerly route around Dallas and Fort Worth, and I-30 assumed the former I-20 route from US 80 to western Fort Worth, and later to the current intersection with I-20 near Aledo.

I-30 was proposed to be extended along the US 67 freeway from Little Rock. However, this conflicted with the Missouri Department of Transportation's plan to extend I-57, which is also planned to use US 67. In April 2016, a provision designating US 67 from North Little Rock to Walnut Ridge, Arkansas, as "Future I-57" was added to the federal fiscal year 2017 Transportation, Housing and Urban Development funding bill. The provision would also give Arkansas the ability to request any segment of the road built to Interstate Highway standards be officially added to the Interstate Highway System as I-57. Had I-30 been extended, there were plans to upgrade Arkansas Highway 226 (AR 226) to Interstate standards and designate it as "Interstate 730".

I-130 was a proposed auxiliary route of I-30 that was planned to be concurrent with I-49. Once the eastern segment of the Texarkana Loop had been upgraded to Interstate standards, I-130 was to have been signed; however, it is now part of I-49.

Exit list

Business routes
I-30 formerly had two business routes, both of which were in Arkansas. There are currently no business routes of I-30.

Benton

Interstate 30 Business (I-30 Bus.) was a business route in Benton, Arkansas. It ran from exit 116 to exit 118 on I-30 from approximately 1960 to 1975, concurrently with US 70C.

Little Rock

Interstate 30 Business (I-30 Bus.) was a business route in Little Rock, Arkansas. The route started at exit 132 on I-30 and followed US 70B nearly its entire route. In North Little Rock, the route remained concurrent with US 70 and terminated at exit 141B at I-30.

See also

Notes

References

External links

 
Interstate Guide: I-30
I-30, downtown Fort Worth and west of downtown – from dfwfreeways.info
I-30, former DFW Turnpike segment – from dfwfreeways.info
I-30, downtown Dallas and east of downtown – from dfwfreeways.info

 
30
30
30
Transportation in Parker County, Texas
Transportation in Tarrant County, Texas
Transportation in Dallas County, Texas
Transportation in Rockwall County, Texas
Transportation in Hunt County, Texas
Transportation in Hopkins County, Texas
Transportation in Franklin County, Texas
Transportation in Titus County, Texas
Transportation in Morris County, Texas
Transportation in Bowie County, Texas
Transportation in Miller County, Arkansas
Transportation in Hempstead County, Arkansas
Transportation in Nevada County, Arkansas
Transportation in Clark County, Arkansas
Transportation in Hot Spring County, Arkansas
Transportation in Pulaski County, Arkansas